Indiaanskop or Indiaans kop  is an island near Aruba.

In the 1950s, a number of ancient cannons were discovered on the seabed near the island. This is also the place where the Spanish pirate ship called St Charlos sailed by skipper Mediasabel in the year 1770 stranded. Presently the island is partially submerged and is marked with light.

References

Islands of Aruba
Former islands of the Netherlands